Robert Prettyman Boyce (c.18141875) was a member of Texas Army, a businessman, and a local municipal official in Houston.

Early life
Robert Boyce was born in 1814 or 1816 in the vicinity of Cincinnati. His father abandoned his mother and he ran away from his mother around the age of ten. He started apprenticing as a carpenter about four years later in Cincinnati. He reconciled with his mother before leaving the Queen City as a journeyman carpenter. He stayed in Natchez, Mississippi before accepting contract carpentry work on the St. Charles Hotel in New Orleans.

Career
In April 1936, Boyce enlisted with a Texas militia organized in New Orleans by Thomas William Ward. He was one of 75 soldiers under the command of William Graham who boarded the schooner Flora bound for Texas. However, the militia missed the Battle of San Jacinto by a couple of days, and Boyce was dispatched to Goliad, Texas with other soldiers to guard the frontier from Mexico. He served in that region for six months, and was discharged with grant of 640 acres of Texas land.

Death and legacy
Boyce died in Houston on February 16, 1888 due to complications from kidney disease. Thomas Hennessey of the Church of the Annunciation presided over the funeral service. Members of the Free Masons and Odd Fellows escorted the procession. He was buried in Glenwood Cemetery in Houston.

References

Bibliography

1888 deaths
People from Ohio
Army of the Republic of Texas
People from Houston
Burials at Glenwood Cemetery (Houston, Texas)
Members of fraternal orders
Politicians from Houston